Graham Whitford (born 25 July 1938) is an Australian former cricketer. He played two first-class cricket matches for Victoria between 1962 and 1963.

See also
 List of Victoria first-class cricketers

References

External links
 

1938 births
Living people
Australian cricketers
Victoria cricketers
Cricketers from Melbourne